Theo Fillo Da Costa Numberi (born 1 September 2001) is an Indonesian professional footballer who plays as a midfielder for Liga 1 club Dewa United.

Club career

Persipura Jayapura
He was signed for Persipura Jayapura to play in Liga 1 in the 2019 season. Numberi made his first-team debut on 18 November 2019 as a substitute in a match against PSM Makassar at the Andi Mattalatta Stadium, Makassar.

Dewa United
Numberi was signed for Dewa United to play in Liga 1 in the 2022–23 season. He made his league debut on 25 July 2022 in a match against Persis Solo at the Moch. Soebroto Stadium, Magelang.

Career statistics

Club

Notes

Honours

International 
Indonesia U-19
 AFF U-19 Youth Championship third place: 2019

References

External links
 Theo Numberi at Soccerway
 Theo Numberi at Liga Indonesia

2001 births
Living people
Indonesian footballers
People from Jayapura
Sportspeople from Papua
Persipura Jayapura players
Dewa United F.C. players
Liga 1 (Indonesia) players
Indonesia youth international footballers
Association football midfielders